Westbourne, also known as Pinehurst, is a historic home located in Richmond, Virginia.  It was designed by architect W. Duncan Lee in 1915, and built in 1919. It is a -story, Georgian Revival style brick dwelling consisting of a symmetrical central block flanked by two-story brick wings and covered with a hipped slate roof.  It features a tetrastyle Corinthian order portico that occupies the center bays of the north elevation. The property includes extensive gardens designed by noted landscape architect Charles F. Gillette.  The house was originally built for Abram L. McClellan a wealthy business man and real estate developer.

It was listed on the National Register of Historic Places in 2000.

References

Houses on the National Register of Historic Places in Virginia
Georgian Revival architecture in Virginia
Houses completed in 1919
Houses in Richmond, Virginia
National Register of Historic Places in Richmond, Virginia
Gilded Age mansions